Rubus pascuus is an uncommon North American species of brambles in the rose family. It grows only in the United States, primarily in the Ozarks of Missouri and Arkansas but with scattered populations farther east in New Jersey, Maryland, Virginia, and the Carolinas.

The genetics of Rubus is extremely complex, so that it is difficult to decide on which groups should be recognized as species. There are many rare species with limited ranges such as this. Further study is suggested to clarify the taxonomy.

References

External links
 

pascuus
Plants described in 1943
Flora of the United States